The people listed below were all born in, residents of, or otherwise closely associated with Demopolis, Alabama:

Art
 Geneva Mercer, sculptor and painter

Athletics
 Richard Basil, former head football coach at Savannah State University
 Tommy Brooker, professional football player
 Robbie Jones, football player, NY Giants, Alabama Crimson Tide
 Andy Phillips, major league baseball player
 Paul Phillips, major league baseball player 
 Theo Ratliff, professional basketball player
 Spencer Turnbull, professional baseball player for The Detroit Tigers
 Emanuel Zanders, football player, New Orleans Saints, Jackson State

Business
 Arthur George Gaston, businessman, real estate tycoon, civil rights leader
 Jim Rogers,  financier and co-founder of  the Quantum Fund

Literature
 Wyatt Rainey Blassingame, author of more than 600 short stories and articles for national magazines, four adult novels and dozens of juvenile nonfiction books
 James Haskins (1941-2005), author (Diary of a Harlem Schoolteacher, The Cotton Club, Black Music in America, Outward Dreams: Black Inventors and Their Inventions, The March on Washington, Black Eagles: African Americans in Aviation)
 Michelle Richmond (born 1970), fiction writer and essayist (The Girl in the Fall-Away Dress,  Dream of the Blue Room)
 Hudson Strode (1892-1976), teacher of creative writing at the University of Alabama from 1924-1964, honored by King Gustaf VI Adolf of Sweden for contributions strengthening cultural relations between the United States and Sweden

Politics
 Richard Henry Clarke, U.S. Representative from 1889 to 1897
 Lacey A. Collier, lawyer and judge of the United States District Court for the Northern District of Florida
 James T. Jones, U.S. Representative from 1877 to 1879 and 1883 to 1889
 Francis Strother Lyon, member of United States Congress and Confederate States Congress
 Bill Owens, Massachusetts businessman and politician, born in Demopolis
 Benjamin Glover Shields, U.S Representative, 1841-1943, and United States Ambassador to Venezuela, 1845-1850

Science
 Waldo Semon,  inductee of the Inventor Hall of Fame, inventor of vinyl, holder of over a hundred patents, born in Demopolis

References

Demopolis
Demopolis, Alabama